Roseomonas frigidaquae is a species of Gram negative, strictly aerobic, coccobacilli-shaped, light pink-colored bacteria. It was first isolated from a water-cooling system from an oxygen-producing plant in Gwangyang, South Korea. The species name is derived from Latin frigidus (cold) and aqua (water).

The optimum growth temperature for R. frigidaquae is 30 °C, but can grow in the 12-37 °C range. The optimum pH is 7.0, and can grow in pH 6.0-10.0.

References

External links
Type strain of Roseomonas frigidaquae at BacDive -  the Bacterial Diversity Metadatabase

Rhodospirillales
Bacteria described in 2009